Adam Fischer may refer to:

 Adam Fischer (sculptor) (1888–1968), Danish sculptor
 Ádám Fischer (born 1949), Hungarian conductor

See also
 Adam Fisher, American baseball executive